Archbishop John Carroll High School is a four-year secondary school part of the Roman Catholic Archdiocese of Philadelphia, located in Radnor, Pennsylvania, on a 55-acre campus.

History
Archbishop John Carroll High School was opened in September 1967. It was officially dedicated and blessed on April 28, 1968. It was originally two separate secondary schools, Archbishop John Carroll for Boys and Archbishop John Carroll for Girls. They were the final secondary schools under the building program instituted by Cardinal John Krol. The schools were named for John Carroll, the first Bishop of the Church in the United States. The two schools became co-educational in September 1986, assuming the name Archbishop John Carroll High School. The school is staffed by as diocesan priests, Sisters of St. Joseph, but majorly lay personnel. The current student body numbers approximately 1,095 (2015). On April 28–29, 2018 Archbishop Carroll with be celebrating it 50 years as a school.

Academic Program of Study
The curriculum is primarily focused upon college-preparatory with elective classes in the fine arts, business education and computer literacy.

The following class groupings are designed to accommodate the needs and challenges the abilities of each student:
 Diocesan Scholar Program (college courses taken during the senior year)
 Advanced Placement (college level work offered in 9 subject areas)
 Honors (above average)
 Track 2 (average)
Recently, Archbishop Carroll graduates have received scholarships worth over $24.5 million (2013), with 98% of all students continuing on to a college or university.

Athletics

Archbishop John Carroll High Schools offers fall, winter, and spring sports, with over 60% of the student body participating in the athletics program. Archbishop Carroll athletic teams compete in the Philadelphia Catholic League and belong to the Pennsylvania Interscholastic Athletic Association PIAA.
In the 2008–09 season, both the Boys and Girls varsity basketball teams won the PIAA AAA State Championship, earning 2 state titles for Archbishop Carroll.

Fall Sports 
 Cheerleading
 Crew
 Cross Country, Boys/Girls
 Field Hockey
 Football
 Golf
 Soccer – Boys/Girls
 Tennis – Girls
 Volleyball

Winter Sports 
 Basketball – Boys/Girls
 Cheerleading
 Fencing
 Ice Hockey
 Indoor Track – Boys/Girls
 Swimming – Boys/Girls
 Unified Bocce (BestBubies)
 Wrestling

Spring Sports 
 Baseball
 Crew
 Lacrosse – Boys/Girls
 Outdoor Track – Boys/Girls
 Softball
 Tennis – Boys

Activities
Archbishop Carroll offers a wide variety of extracurricular activities, including:

Academic Clubs:
 Concert Band
 Delco Hi-Q
 Mathletes
 Mixed Select Chorus
 National Art Honor Society
 National Honor Society
 Pennsylvania Junior Academy of Science (PJAS)
 Reading Olympics
 Tri-M Music Honor Society 
 Close Up Foundation

Publications
 Carroll Times
 Legacy (Yearbook)
 Origins

Service Clubs
 Community Service Corps (CSC)
 Diversity Club
 PatrioTHON
 Pro-Life Club
 Students Against Drunk Driving (SADD)
 Red Cross-Blood Drive
 Student Ambassadors
 Student Council

Social Clubs
 Dance Committee
 Intramurals

Special Interest
 Archbishop Carroll Theater Society (ACTS)
 Art Club
 Band/Color Guard
 Best Buddies
 Game Club
 Mock Trial Club
 Patriot News TV
 Ultimate Frisbee

Notable alumni
Maria Bello, actress; World Trade Center (film), Thank You for Smoking, Secret Window, Coyote Ugly (film), and ER (TV series)
Will Smith, actor; The Fresh Prince of Bel-Air, After Earth, Shark Tale, and Suicide Squad (film).
Brad Ingelsby, screenwriter; Mare of Easttown (TV series), Out of the Furnace (film), The Way Back (film) [cite: https://www.inquirer.com/philly/entertainment/movies/20150825_Screenwriter_Brad_Ingelsby__Out_of_Philadelphia_to__Out_of_the_Furnace_.html#%23loaded]
Kevin Brennan, played Batfink to rave reviews. Comedian, podcaster and  professional curmudgeon
Burt Grossman, retired NFL player, Philadelphia Eagles and San Diego Chargers
Brian McDonough physician, author and television-radio personality
Lawrence Nowlan, sculptor
Gerard Phelan, Wide Receiver Boston College; caught famed Hail Mary pass from Doug Flutie (1984) vs. University of Miami
John Prendergast, Class of 1981, human rights activist, author, and former Director for African Affairs at the National Security Council
Maurice Stovall, Wide Receiver; Tampa Bay Buccaneers
Mike Costanzo,  Former Third Baseman; Cincinnati Reds
Joseph Clancy, Director of the Secret Service
Derrick Jones Jr., NBA power forward for the Portland Trail Blazers
Eric Tangradi, Former NHL Forward Pittsburgh Penguins

Sources and references

External links
http://www.jcarroll.org

Catholic secondary schools in Pennsylvania
Roman Catholic Archdiocese of Philadelphia
Educational institutions established in 1967
Schools in Delaware County, Pennsylvania
1967 establishments in Pennsylvania